Roitsa is a rural locality (a village) in Ugolskoye Rural Settlement, Sheksninsky District, Vologda Oblast, Russia. The population was 3 as of 2002.

Geography 
Roitsa is located 26 km southeast of Sheksna (the district's administrative centre) by road. Shayma is the nearest rural locality.

References 

Rural localities in Sheksninsky District